Wrights Crossroads is an unincorporated community in Kent County, Delaware, United States. Wrights Crossroads is located at the intersection of Delaware Route 11 and Butterpat Road/Hourglass Road, southwest of Hartly.

References 

Unincorporated communities in Kent County, Delaware
Unincorporated communities in Delaware